Blažejov is a municipality and village in Jindřichův Hradec District in the South Bohemian Region of the Czech Republic. It has about 500 inhabitants.

Administrative parts
Villages of Dvoreček, Malý Ratmírov, Mutyněves and Oldřiš are administrative parts of Blažejov.

References

External links

Villages in Jindřichův Hradec District